The Act is a musical with a book by George Furth, lyrics by Fred Ebb, and music by John Kander.

It was written to showcase the talents of Kander and Ebb favorite Liza Minnelli, who portrayed Michelle Craig, a fading film star attempting a comeback as a Las Vegas singer.  The musical premiered on Broadway in 1977.

Production 
Originally titled, Shine It On, The Act played out-of-town tryouts for 15 weeks in Chicago, San Francisco, and Los Angeles. The musical opened on Broadway on October 29, 1977, at the Majestic Theatre, where it ran for 233 performances and six previews.

Directed by Martin Scorsese, choreographed by Ron Lewis, with costumes by Halston, the cast included Barry Nelson, Mark Goddard and Wayne Cilento. The New York Times reported that "director Gower Champion quietly came in to doctor the show during its final month in Los Angeles."

The New York Times reviewer wrote that "The Act is precisely what its name implies: It is an act, and a splendid one. On the other hand, it is a little less than its pretensions imply. Theatrical though it is as a performance, it is indifferent musical theater." Another New York Times writer noted that "If there's a point 'The Act' underscores most, it's that Miss Minnelli on Broadway has incomparable star power."

With an all-time ticket-price high of $25 for Saturday night orchestra seats, The Act had $2 million in advance sales, then the highest in Broadway history. But the production was doomed from the start, with its star in erratic behavior and frequently missed performances, more than 10% of the entire run. During out-of-town tryouts, Gower Champion was called to help with the staging (but took no directorial credit). Additionally, the original costumes were replaced. With the additional costs and with refund demands running high, it was impossible for the show to recoup its costs.

For her role, Liza Minnelli won the Tony Award for Best Actress in a Musical.

Cast and characters 
 Michelle Craig – Liza Minnelli
 Dan Connors – Barry Nelson
 Molly Connors – Gayle Crofoot
 Lenny Kanter – Christopher Barrett
 Charley Price – Mark Goddard
 Arthur/One of the Boys – Roger Minami
 Nat Schrieber – Arnold Soboloff
 Dance Alternate – Claudia Asbury
 Dance Alternate – Brad Witsger
 One of the Boys – Wayne Cliento
 One of the Boys – Michael Leeds
 One of the Boys – Albert Stephenson
 One of the Girls – Carol Estey
 One of the Girls – Laurie Dawn Skinner

Song list 

 Act I
 "Shine It On" – Michelle Craig and Chorus
 "It's the Strangest Thing" – Michelle Craig
 "Bobo's" – Michelle Craig and Dancers
 "Turning" – Michelle Craig
 "Little Do They Know" – Boys and Girls
 "Arthur in the Afternoon" – Michelle Craig and Arthur
 "Hollywood, California" – Michelle Craig and Dancers
 "The Money Tree" – Michelle Craig

 Act II
 "City Lights" – Michelle Craig and Chorus
 "There When I Need Him" – Michelle Craig
 "Hot Enough for You?" – Michelle Craig and Dancers
 "Little Do They Know" (Reprise) – Boys and Girls
 "My Own Space" – Michelle Craig
 "Walking Papers" – Michelle Craig

Awards and nominations

Original Broadway production

References

External links 
 

1977 musicals
Broadway musicals
Original musicals
Clark County, Nevada in fiction
Musicals by Kander and Ebb
Liza Minnelli soundtracks
Tony Award-winning musicals